Bourassa-Sauvé is a provincial electoral district in Quebec, Canada, that elects members to the National Assembly of Quebec. It is located within Montreal and consists of most of the borough of Montréal-Nord.

It was created for the 2003 election from parts of Bourassa and Sauvé.

In the change from the 2001 to the 2011 electoral map, its territory was unchanged.

Members of the National Assembly

Results

^ CAQ change is from ADQ

References

External links
Information
 Elections Quebec

Election results
 Election results (National Assembly)

Maps
 2011 map (PDF)
 2001 map (Flash)
2001–2011 changes (Flash)
1992–2001 changes to Bourassa (Flash)
1992–2001 changes to Sauvé (Flash)
 Electoral map of Montréal region
 Quebec electoral map, 2011

Montréal-Nord
Provincial electoral districts of Montreal
Quebec provincial electoral districts